Dipterocarpus validus is a species of tree in the family Dipterocarpaceae, endemic to Kalimantan, Sabah and the Philippines. The species is common in both primary and secondary forest, often occurring along rivers and in freshwater swamps. It yields wood-oil and is cut for keruing timber.

References

validus
Trees of Borneo
Trees of the Philippines
Critically endangered flora of Asia